Sports and Recreation Complex Pools Smederevo (SRC Pools Smederevo; ; sometimes short Pools Smederevo) is swimming pools complex in Smederevo, Serbia. The complex is located within the SC Smederevo. It consists of an Olympic pool dimensions 22x50 m, and two smaller pools for children and non-swimmers. Olympic pool meets all FINA standards and is equipped with technology that meets the stringent requirements international swimming events. Capacity pools complex is 7,000 seats.

International matches
Serbia national water polo team is on this pool played one game.

See also
 Sports Hall Smederevo

References 

Smederevo
Swimming venues in Serbia